NGC 4656/57 is a highly warped barred spiral galaxy located in the constellation Canes Venatici and is sometimes informally called the Hockey Stick Galaxies or the Crowbar Galaxy. Its unusual shape is thought to be due to an interaction between NGC 4656, NGC 4631, and NGC 4627. The galaxy is a member of the NGC 4631 Group. A Luminous Blue Variable in "super-outburst" was discovered in NGC 4656/57 on March 21, 2005.

See also
 Antennae Galaxies

References

External links

 Hockey Stick (NGC 4656)
 SEDS – NGC 4656

Canes Venatici
NGC 4631 Group
4656
07907
42863
Interacting galaxies
Barred spiral galaxies